The following is a list of business schools in the United States. Business schools are listed in alphabetical order by state, then name. Schools named after people are alphabetized by last name. Accreditation bodies for business schools in the United States include Association to Advance Collegiate Schools of Business (AACSB), Accreditation Council for Business Schools and Programs (ACBSP), and International Assembly for Collegiate Business Education (IACBE).

See also 
Lists of business school, other continents
 List of business schools in Africa
 List of business schools in Australia
 List of business schools in Asia
 List of business schools in Europe

References

 
Business schools in the United States
Business schools
United States